The Phoenix Brewery (also known as Finns Brewery) was a brewery run by the Finns family in Newbury, Berkshire, UK.

History 
The brewery was founded in the early 19th century.

Premises 
The brewer's house on Bartholemew Street was built in the 17th century and designed by James Clarke.

The main brewery buildings including the two-storey beerhouse and the three-storey brewhouse date from approximately 1842.  The beerhouse features recessed sash windows and hipped roofing.  The doorway to the building is wide and designed to be used for service access.

The top floor of the brewhouse contained a hoist, grain mill, water tanks and malt stores.  The first floor held the engine room and the tuns while the ground floor housed the boiler, pumps, the well, and stores for barrels.  The exterior of the brewhouse features a slated roof, dentil cornice and arched windows.  The gables include crown glass louvres.

The complex became a Grade II listed building in November 1981.

Closure 
In the 1923, the brewery closed and was taken over by Ushers of Trowbridge. The closure meant that there was no commercial brewery in West Berkshire for 71 years, until Butts Brewery opened in Great Shefford in 1994. Upon closure, the brewhouse was converted to be used for storage.

Current use 
In the early 2000s, the brewhouse was used as a restaurant and bar.  In 2004, however, the business was refused an entertainment licence due to objections from local police. In 2008, the main brewery building was opened as apartments.

References

See also 
 List of Breweries in Berkshire

Grade II listed industrial buildings
Grade II listed buildings in Berkshire
Breweries in England
Companies based in Berkshire